Hurricane Irene was a large and destructive tropical cyclone which affected much of the Caribbean and East Coast of the United States during late August 2011. The ninth named storm, first hurricane, and first major hurricane of the 2011 Atlantic hurricane season, Irene originated from a well-defined Atlantic tropical wave that began showing signs of organization east of the Lesser Antilles. Due to development of atmospheric convection and a closed center of circulation, the system was designated as Tropical Storm Irene on August 20, 2011. After intensifying, Irene made landfall in St. Croix as a strong tropical storm later that day. Early on August 21, the storm made a second landfall in Puerto Rico. While crossing the island, Irene strengthened into a Category 1 hurricane. The storm paralleled offshore of Hispaniola, continuing to slowly intensify in the process. Shortly before making four landfalls in the Bahamas, Irene peaked as a  Category 3 hurricane.

Thereafter, the storm slowly leveled off in intensity as it struck the Bahamas and then curved northward after passing east of Grand Bahama. Continuing to weaken, Irene was downgraded to a Category 1 hurricane before making landfall on the Outer Banks of North Carolina on August 27, becoming the first hurricane to make landfall in the United States since Hurricane Ike in 2008. Later that day, the storm re-emerged into the Atlantic from southeastern Virginia. Although Irene remained a hurricane over water, it weakened to a tropical storm while making yet another landfall in the Little Egg Inlet in southeastern New Jersey on August 27. A few hours later, Irene made its ninth and final landfall in Brooklyn, New York City. Early on August 29, Irene transitioned into an extratropical cyclone while striking Vermont, after remaining inland as a tropical cyclone for less than 12 hours.

Throughout its path, Irene caused widespread destruction and at least 49 deaths. Damage estimates throughout the United States are estimated near $13.5 billion, making Irene one of the costliest hurricanes on record in the country. In addition, monetary losses in the Caribbean and Canada were $830 million and $130 million respectively for a total of nearly $14.2 billion in damage.

Meteorological history

On August 15, 2011, a tropical wave exited the west African coast and emerged into the Atlantic, characterized by a distinct low-level cyclonic rotation and deep tropical humidity. It remained well-defined while moving steadily westward for several days to the south of the Cape Verde Islands, although at the time any notable convection occurred well to the southwest of its axis. As the wave distanced itself from the islands, development of thunderstorms and showers in its proximity continued to remain scarce, and it became rather broad in appearance. On August 19, the convective structure began to show signs of organization as the associated atmospheric pressure lowered, and with a progressively favorable environment situated ahead of the wave its chances of undergoing tropical cyclogenesis markedly increased. The strong thunderstorm activity continued to become more pronounced around the main low-pressure feature. By August 20, the National Hurricane Center noted that tropical cyclone formation was imminent as the wave neared the Lesser Antilles, and a reconnaissance aircraft confirmed the presence of a small surface circulation center just southwest of a burst of vigorous convection and unusually high sustained winds, indicating sufficient organization for the cyclone to be upgraded into Tropical Storm Irene at 23:00 UTC that day.

Its mid-level circulation continued to become better established as hints of pronounced banding features curved north of the surface center. On August 21, the surface center reformed closer to the deepest convection; furthermore, an anticyclone aloft provided supportive outflow over the cyclone. With the improved structure, as well as light wind shear and high sea surface temperatures, Irene was forecast to strengthen to near hurricane force prior to landfall in Hispaniola. Over the subsequent day (August 22), while passing near the island of Saint Croix in the U.S. Virgin Islands, Irene traced toward Puerto Rico, more northward than initially expected, where it underwent a considerable increase in strength and organization. Despite the storm's interaction with land, radar imagery showed a ragged eye-like feature, and Doppler weather radar data indicated wind speeds in excess of hurricane force. Just after its initial landfall, Irene was accordingly upgraded to a Category 1 hurricane, the first of the 2011 Atlantic hurricane season.

With the hurricane then situated just north of the mountainous coast of Hispaniola, the storm deepened little after reemerging over water, and any additional organization during the rest of the day was gradual. After briefly weakening on August 23, however, Irene began to develop a distinct eye encircled by an area of deepening convection the next morning. Moving erratically through the southeast Bahamas over very warm waters, Irene quickly expanded as its outflow aloft became very well established; the cyclone intensified into a Category 3 major hurricane as it recurved toward the northwest along a weakness in the subtropical ridge. The cyclone subsequently underwent a partial eyewall replacement cycle, which resulted in some reduction in its winds. Although a distinct eye redeveloped for a few hours, it obscured once again soon thereafter; Irene was unable to recover from the cycle, with no further significant intensification expected thereafter.

Early on August 27, Irene further weakened to a Category 1 hurricane as it approached the Outer Banks of North Carolina. After having tracked over land for about 10 hours, the eye of Irene became cloud-filled, although the center remained well-defined on radar images. Early in the evening of August 27, Irene re-emerged into the Atlantic near the southern end of the Chesapeake Bay in Virginia as a marginal Category 1 hurricane, slowly weakening as it continued northward and weakening to a tropical storm early on August 28. About  hours later, Tropical Storm Irene made landfall with  winds in the Coney Island neighborhood of Brooklyn, New York.

Following its final New York landfall, Irene moved northeast over New England while maintaining its strength, before it was declared an extratropical cyclone early on August 29, while its center was located near the New Hampshire/Vermont border. During that day, the system continued to move towards the northeast, before it was absorbed by a frontal system early on August 30. This system, which the Free University of Berlin dubbed as Ex-Irene, continued moving northeastward for another few days, reaching Iceland on September 2. Afterward, the system stalled just south of Iceland and gradually weakened, before it was absorbed by another approaching extratropical cyclone to the west on September 6.

Preparations

Caribbean
In response to the formation of Irene, tropical storm warnings were issued for all of the Leeward Islands and Puerto Rico. Also in the Lesser Antilles, the storm's approach prompted authorities in the U.S. Virgin Islands to close off air- and seaports, as well as to open public shelters. As Irene was forecast to make landfall on Hispaniola, a tropical storm watch was initially issued for the south coast of the Dominican Republic, though it was upgraded to a hurricane warning on August 21, after strengthening was forecast. In light of the expected intensification to hurricane status, a tropical storm warning was also issued for the northern coast fire of that country, while a tropical storm watch was put in effect for all of Haiti; the tropical storm warning for Puerto Rico was simultaneously upgraded to a hurricane watch. Later that day, all of the Dominican Republic was placed under a hurricane warning, with the tropical storm watch for Haiti upgraded to a warning and a tropical storm watch initiated for the southeastern Bahamas and the Turks and Caicos Islands. As Irene's forecast track became justified, the latter watch was upgraded to a warning on August 22, while a hurricane watch was declared for the central Bahamas.

Mainland United States
With Irene's projected path fixed over much of the United States East Coast, over 65 million people from the Carolinas to northern New England were estimated to be at risk. Due to the threat, state officials, as well as utilities, transportation facilities, ports, industries, oil refineries, and nuclear power plants, promptly prepared to activate emergency plans; residents in the areas stocked up on food supplies and worked to secure homes, vehicles and boats. States of emergency and hurricane warnings were declared for much of the East Coast, including North Carolina, Virginia, Maryland, Delaware, the District of Columbia, Pennsylvania, New Jersey, New York, Connecticut, Rhode Island, Massachusetts, Vermont, New Hampshire, and Maine.

In advance of the storm, hundreds of thousands of people evacuated near coastal areas, and hundreds of shelters were prepared. Many gasoline stations in the region reported shortages due to the preparations for Irene. Six Major League Baseball games were postponed or moved to August 27 in doubleheaders, and one National Football League preseason game was postponed. The Barclays golf tournament was shortened and three Major League Soccer games were postponed.

Southeast

In South Carolina, Emergency Management was already on standby in Charleston and Dorchester counties in preparation for September. On August 23, preparations were also being made in Beaufort County as well. The gondolas were removed from the Myrtle Beach SkyWheel attraction in preparation for tropical-storm-force winds.

In North Carolina, a mandatory evacuation order was issued on August 23, for Ocracoke Island and Hyde County. Governor Bev Perdue declared a state of emergency on August 25, with hurricane and tropical storm watches posted for the state; a mandatory evacuation was issued for Carteret County and for all tourists of Dare County, though the latter was extended to include all residents by the next day. In addition, officials urged residents at the Bogue Banks to commence evacuations by 6 am August 26, and tourists in Currituck County were advised to move inland. Seymour Johnson Air Force Base planned to move jets to Barksdale Air Force Base in Louisiana; Marine Corps Air Station Cherry Point and Marine Corps Air Station New River both evacuated their aircraft as well. Progress Energy announced on August 26, it would have 800 more line workers and 250 tree cutters ready after Hurricane Irene. Officials at UNC-Wilmington issued a voluntary evacuation and enforced a curfew in response to the storm, interrupting move-in activities. As low-level atmospheric confluence within the outer bands developed near the coast, a tornado watch was issued from north-northeast of Cape Hatteras to southwest of Wilmington.

Virginia Governor Bob McDonnell declared a state of emergency in preparation for any possible effects from the hurricane along coastlines. Authorities in the cities of Norfolk, Virginia Beach, Newport News, Hampton, and Portsmouth issued voluntary and mandatory evacuations for low-lying and oceanfront areas. The city of Poquoson ordered a mandatory evacuation for all of its citizens. Public storm shelters were opened in most of the cities, and officials also prepared school buildings to accommodate evacuees. By August 25, dozens of vessels at the Norfolk and Newport News shipyards began to evacuate or prepare to weather the storm, including the carriers Enterprise, Dwight D. Eisenhower, Harry S. Truman, Theodore Roosevelt, and the construction site of the Gerald R. Ford. The United States Navy ordered ships to halt their operations and clear the warning zone. Fort Monroe Army base was evacuated on August 26; Langley Air Force Base followed suit the next day, save essential personnel.

Mid-Atlantic

On August 25, Maryland Governor Martin O'Malley declared a state of emergency in preparation for Irene. The town of Ocean City initiated "phase one" of its contingency plan that same day, which includes a mandatory evacuation order for international workforce students. Hours later, phase three of the plan was instituted; it ordered a mandatory evacuation scheduled to start at midnight August 25, for all residents, with the requirement that everyone be evacuated by 5 pm local time, August 26. On August 26, Dorchester and Wicomico Counties declared states of emergency. Certain geographic areas of Somerset and Wicomico Counties, along with all mobile homes in Wicomico County, had mandatory evacuation orders put in effect. Public shelters were made available in Dorchester, Somerset, Wicomico, and Worcester Counties.

In Delaware, Governor Jack Markell ordered visitors to evacuate the Delaware beaches effective 6:00 pm on August 25. In addition, he declared a state of emergency; shelters were scheduled to open throughout the state on August 26. The Cape May – Lewes Ferry across Delaware Bay also suspended service for late August 27, through August 28, in response to the pending arrival of the hurricane. Toll operations on Delaware Route 1 were halted in order to optimize evacuation rates along highways. Transit services were expected to be shut down on August 27 and 28, while bridges over the Chesapeake and Delaware Canal and the Indian River were closed due to high wind. A tornado watch was issued for Delaware in association with Irene at 10:40 am August 27.

In Washington, D.C., the forecast arrival of Hurricane Irene caused postponement of the planned August 28 dedication ceremony for the Martin Luther King Jr. Memorial. In anticipation of the storm, thousands of sandbags were prepared for placement at flood-prone Washington Metro station entrances. Amtrak service from Washington's Union Station southward was cancelled from August 26, until August 28.

In eastern Pennsylvania, the ground was already saturated with water when the hurricane arrived, since the preceding month had been the wettest ever recorded. Philadelphia mayor Michael Nutter expressed concern that there could be severe devastation in the city and surrounding areas, and Governor Tom Corbett declared a state of emergency in Pennsylvania. The Southeastern Pennsylvania Transportation Authority decided to halt all commuter rail service after midnight August 28. On August 26, Philadelphia's mayor announced there would be no mandatory evacuations for the city, but urged residents to be prudent and to take action and leave should conditions warrant. Officials prepared to open three large shelters on the evening of August 27, capable of holding up to 6,000 people. The Philadelphia International Airport closed at 10:30 pm on Saturday and remained closed until Monday.

In New Jersey, Governor Chris Christie declared a state of emergency on August 25, with President Obama reaffirming the declaration nationally by August 27. Mandatory evacuations were ordered for all of Cape May County and all Atlantic County shore communities east of Route 9, prompting Atlantic City's first evacuation in history. About 1,500 National Guard troops were deployed in New Jersey. One National Guard outfit was deployed to flood-prone Manville, NJ, (which was also devastated by Hurricane Floyd in 1999) A couple of National Guardsman attempted to drive two of their deep-water-capable FMTVs through the flooding, but the floodwaters were too deep. The vehicles were overtaken by the waters beneath a dipping Conrail underpass on South Main Street. The Guardsmen were photographed and videotaped by onlookers above them on the train bridge, and both photos and videos went viral over social media. Mandatory evacuations were also ordered for all of Long Beach Island in Ocean County and the Barnegat Peninsula. To relieve evacuation traffic, toll operations were temporarily suspended on the Garden State Parkway south of the Raritan River and on the Atlantic City Expressway. Residents of low-lying areas of Hudson County along the Hudson River and Upper New York Bay were advised to evacuate.

Governor of New York Andrew Cuomo declared a state of emergency on August 26, and that day issued a mandatory evacuation order for low-lying areas of New York City. A day prior, New York City Mayor Michael Bloomberg had announced that the city would prepare to create "an enormous shelter system" for residents without access to higher ground. President Barack Obama issued a state of emergency declaration for the New York metropolitan area, freeing federal disaster funds, and tasking the Federal Emergency Management Agency and the Department of Homeland Security to coordinate disaster relief efforts. Cuomo deployed 2,000 National Guard troops to assist police, the Metropolitan Transportation Authority (MTA) and the Port Authority in New York and Long Island. Possible rising seawater levels from storm surge and a predicted high tide led to a complete shutdown of the MTA, the nation's largest mass transit system. All subway, bus, and commuter rail service in New York City was halted at noon on August 27. Four area hospitals began evacuating patients on August 26; sixteen nursing homes and adult care facilities were also evacuated. The New York International Fringe Festival cancelled all performances for August 27, and 28, as did all Broadway shows for those days. The United States Tennis Association cancelled special events planned for the 2011 US Open.

New England

Southern Connecticut, along the Long Island Sound, had a hurricane warning in place as of August 27, while northern Connecticut had a tropical storm warning. Governor Dannel Malloy declared a state of emergency and the state's emergency operations center was fully activated. As of 11 a.m. on August 26, about 33,000 sandbags had been distributed to state residents. Bridgeport sustained heavier damages and many parts of south Groton had numerous power outages which took weeks to get up back and running.

In Rhode Island, the Army Corps of Engineers closed the Fox Point Hurricane Barrier in anticipation that the hurricane would make a direct strike on Providence.

In Massachusetts, Governor Deval Patrick declared a state of emergency on August 26, activated 500 Massachusetts National Guard troops, and also planned to activate an additional 2,000 troops the following day in preparation for the storm. In an unprecedented move, the MBTA suspended all metropolitan Boston public transportation at 8:00 am on August 28.

In Vermont, Governor Peter Shumlin declared a state of emergency on August 27, in preparation for the hurricane's arrival. In a joint statement, Vermont electric utilities announced that they planned to have extra staff on hand.

In Maine, Governor Paul LePage declared a state of emergency on August 26, in preparation for the expected arrival of Hurricane Irene on August 28. Canadian utility and line workers were dispatched to Maine to assist in reinforcing the state's electrical infrastructure. Ten shelters were to be opened in Maine.

Canada

Near Halifax, Nova Scotia, Canada, numerous large local and ocean-going vessels anchored in Bedford Basin to ride out the storm.

Impact

Lesser Antilles
Following its path through the northeastern Caribbean, Irene spread tropical storm conditions across all of the Leeward Islands, causing overall little damage but flooded some low-lying areas. To the south, strong thunderstorms and showers spread over Martinique, though most of the activity occurred prior to development into a tropical cyclone. In spite of the center tracking just north of Guadeloupe's island Grande-Terre, the strongest effects were brought on by Irene's outer rainbands. Accompanying intermittent torrents swept through much of the territory, but overall rainfall was moderate; precipitation totals of between  fell in Basse-Terre during the event. Due to the storm conditions, LIAT was forced to suspend all of its flights in Antigua for early August 22.

Passing near the British Virgin Islands while strengthening, Irene brought gusty winds and heavy precipitation to the territory; however, resultant property damage was minimal. A lightning strike over Necker Island sparked a large fire at one of business magnate Richard Branson's resort homes, but all of its guest occupants—including British actress Kate Winslet—were able to exit the area. Irene crossed Saint Croix, U.S. Virgin Islands as a strong tropical storm on August 21, though relatively calm winds associated with the passage of its center were recorded over the island. To the north in Saint Thomas, storm conditions became progressively worse; sustained gale-force winds swept across the territory, with a gust of up to  recorded at 21:20 UTC. Upon impact, the winds and inclement weather caused scattered power outages across all islands. Wide-scale assessments confirmed light damage to public schools, mostly confined to debris and leaks.

Greater Antilles

Puerto Rico

Across Puerto Rico, heavy rains caused extensive damage to roads while hurricane-force winds toppled many trees and utility poles, which led more than 1 million residences without power. President Barack Obama declared a state of emergency. About 121,000 customers were cut off from potable water service at the height of the storm. Across the territory at least 1,044 people had to take shelter, and 1,446 people in total were evacuated. At higher elevations, winds estimated by radar neared . Several rivers burst their banks as a consequence of the rains, causing additional flooding. The agricultural sector also suffered losses from the storm, particularly near the location of landfall. High winds uprooted crop plants, and several coffee and banana plantations sustained minor damage. Of the plantations, the most affected were situated in Yabucoa and Maunabo, where severe flooding washed out copious amounts of banana crop. The rains continued to fall for hours into the wake of the storm, prompting the issuance of flood watches. In total, Irene affected over 1,500 people in Puerto Rico, and one driver was killed after their vehicle was caught in swollen currents. Preliminary estimates indicate structural damage could be as high as $500 million (USD), with additional losses due to the three-day labor suspensions pinned at over $60.4 million (USD).

Offshore near Culebra Island, a sailboat was reported to have sunk due to rough seas prior to landfall in mainland Puerto Rico. Gale-force winds felled fences and shattered windows, with a flying object piercing through one residence. A total of 46 locals sought refuge to ride out the storm, but one family required post-storm shelter after the roof to their home was lost. Some power and telephone service cutoffs were reported, and the island's airport halted its operations.

Hispaniola
Skirting barely north past Hispaniola, the large storm produced gales and prolonged precipitation in the Dominican Republic, displacing over 37,700 people and leaving at least 88 communities isolated in its wake. Accompanying storm surge affected roughly 200 homes and prompted evacuations along the northern coastlines. The strongest winds also occurred in northern Cibao, where they felled multiple trees and toppled utility poles. Swollen rivers, creeks, and streams caused widespread residential flooding and damage to roads; saturated soil in the region triggered mudslides, causing additional disruptions. Despite its distance, Irene produced extreme rainfall in southern parts of the country that led to many secondary effects. Resultant floods combined with two overflown rivers swept through much of San Cristóbal, causing one bridge to collapse under the rushing waters. The flooding produced at least two drown victims in that area, both later confirmed dead. Elsewhere, another fatality occurred in Cambita Garabitos, and six others were listed as missing. Heavy rains also fell across La Altagracia Province, where one person in Higüey went missing and hundreds were evacuated. Most of the damage in the region occurred due to flooded rivers, with some agricultural losses reported. The excess surface waters overwhelmed and damaged some 170 inlets. In all, Irene affected at least 2,292 households according to preliminary reports, with 16 houses rendered beyond repair. The associated monetary losses surmounted RD$1 billion (US$30 million) in the wake of the event.

In northeastern Haiti, the prolonged precipitation overflowed rivers and produced surface floods and damaging landslides across multiple road sections. About 500 residents in risk zones evacuated while some sought shelter, but only one of more than 160 evacuation sites required usage. Rough surge produced high coastal flooding, with some reports of thousands of damaged homes. In the vicinity of Port-au-Prince, brisk winds blew down many refuge tents home to victims from the major January 12, 2010 earthquake. Overall, officials indicated impact was less severe than initially feared; the storm only left isolated flood damage in its wake, particularly throughout northern parts of the country. However, two people lost their lives after being caught in swollen rivers, and four others suffered injuries.

Cuba
As Irene was tracking through the Bahamas, the outer bands of the storm dropped light rainfall in eastern Cuba. The cities of Moa and Sagua de Tánamo in Holguín Province reported  of rain. However, the average rainfall throughout the Holguín Province did not exceed . Some damage occurred throughout Guantánamo Province, where rough surf and rains caused flooding in Baracoa. The strong waves, combined with high tide, caused a slight coastal flooding.

Turks and Caicos and the Bahamas
Turks and Caicos

On August 24, Irene passed over the British Overseas Territory of Turks and Caicos Islands at Category 1 strength. The hurricane produced high winds that blew off roofs and downed power lines throughout the territory. In Cockburn Town, residences reported loss of power, and light poles were toppled. Many homes on Grand Turk Island also reported a loss of electricity during Irene's passage, although structural damage in the area was limited. The strongest of the rains and gusts occurred in Providenciales, where light wind damage was reported to roofs and resorts. The Grand Turk cruise port also sustained some minor damage from the storm, but operations resumed three days after impact.

Bahamas 
 A major hurricane, Irene trekked right through the Bahamas, with its eye making landfall on several of the islands. The extreme winds damaged at least 40 homes on Mayaguana Island, and dozens of homes on Acklins were completely obliterated. On the latter island, the hurricane reportedly wiped out 90 percent of the Lovely Bay settlement. As well, a local church on the island partially collapsed due to the storm. The worst of the destruction occurred in Cat Island, characterized by widespread shattered glass and torn houses. In all, the storm caused "millions of dollars" worth in structural damage on the island, and left many homeless. Across New Providence and Grand Bahama, only limited impact occurred as Irene remained well offshore; businesses operations were scheduled to return to normal shortly after the storm. Nationwide, the damage was estimated at $40 million. Despite the overall extensive structural damage inflicted, there were no reports of fatalities on the islands in the wake of disaster.

United States

Gales from Irene affected nearly all of the Eastern Seaboard, extending from Florida to New England and as far inland as central New York and central Pennsylvania, affecting all or large parts of 15 states and the District of Columbia. The winds, combined with soil saturation due to the extreme amounts of precipitation in many of the impacted areas both from Irene and from previous thunderstorms, uprooted countless trees and power lines along the storm's path. Roughly 7.4 million homes and businesses lost electrical power, with approximately 3.3 million still without power as of August 30, three days after landfall. Coastal areas suffered extensive flood damage following its potent storm surge, with additional freshwater flooding reported in many areas. The storm spawned scattered tornadoes, causing significant property damage as evidenced by destroyed homes. In the northeastern region, more than ten rivers measured record flood heights at their hydrographs. Rivers in at least six Northeastern states reached hundred-year flood levels, while the flooding in Greene County, New York was described as five-hundred-year-flood conditions. Flooding in Schoharie County, New York was also reported by the National Weather Service in Albany, New York as five-hundred-year-flood conditions. Throughout its path in the contiguous United States, Irene caused approximately $13.5 billion (2011 USD) in damage and 47 deaths.

Southeast

Florida
Though Irene spared Florida from a direct hit, its outermost rainbands produced squalls and intermittent torrents along the state's eastern coastlines. Elsewhere, in Lantana, large waves sweeping over seawalls went on to destroy a lifeguard tower. Localized beach erosion was also reported, although it was not significant. Precipitation in the area was also light, with a peak accumulation of  recorded at Fort Lauderdale Executive Airport.

South Carolina
Owing to its unusually large windfield, Irene affected long stretches of South Carolina coastlines with gusts and sporadic heavy showers, even though it remained offshore. Gale-force winds picked up through the Lowcountry during the afternoon of August 26, with a gust of  measured at a coastal marine observing site on Folly Island. Scattered power outages left over 4,000 residences in the dark, mostly due to toppled utility poles. The winds also felled trees and generated rough surf along Charleston County coastlines, and minor beach erosion was noted. Elsewhere in that county, a downed tree trapped several people in their vehicle, but they were all rescued.

North Carolina
In addition to the gales, Irene spawned several tornadoes early on August 27, while approaching the coast.

The large hurricane left extensive damage in its wake and produced tornadoes that damaged homes and overturned vehicles. Following the touch down of a potent tornado, at least four homes were demolished in Columbia, while up to three others sustained significant damage. The hurricane caused multiple flooded areas and uprooted trees along coastlines; in Nash County, a snatched tree limb struck and killed one person. Prior to the storm, a resident in Onslow County suffered a fatal heart attack while applying plywood to his house. Two people in Pitt and Sampson Counties were additionally killed by falling trees, as were two others in Goldsboro and Pitt County in traffic accidents. A man also drowned in the flooded Cape Fear River. All in all, over 1,100 homes were destroyed. The estimated $71 million in damage did not include agricultural losses.

Hurricane Irene cut several breaches across North Carolina Highway 12 on Hatteras Island, isolating the island from the rest of the Outer Banks. As a result, the only way to access Hatteras Island was by ferry. On October 10, 2011, a temporary  bridge opened over the breach. The bridge could be in place for more than 10 years while other solutions are considered.

The path of the hurricane was thought by many to be the worst-case scenario for the Outer Banks, just east over the Pamlico Sound. The storm winds pushed the water rushing into the sound in the form of rainfall back up the rivers feeding the sound and when the hurricane passed the water rushed back out causing historic flooding along the Outer Banks in particular in the towns of Waves, Rodanthe and Salvo. The flood caused major damage to the area that can still be seen in Mirlo Beach at the north end of Rodanthe. Flood waters exceeded seven feet in many locations and destroyed many houses and businesses.

Virginia

A tornado moved through the Sandbridge community in Virginia Beach, in the morning hours of August 27, ripping the roofs off at least five homes and damaging several others. High winds in Newport News knocked a tree into an apartment complex. Three other Virginians in Brunswick, Chesterfield and King William Counties were also killed by falling trees. Most severe damage consisted of many downed trees on power lines, cars, homes, and roads; and flooding in many low-lying roads and neighborhoods – 1.2 million homes and businesses lost power due to Irene.

Mid-Atlantic states
Hurricane Irene caused widespread power outages in Delaware, Maryland, New Jersey, Pennsylvania, and Washington, D.C.

Maryland

Dorchester General Hospital in Cambridge was evacuated after there was wind and water damage to the laboratory roof. In Queen Anne's County, Maryland, an 85-year-old woman was killed when a tree fell onto her house causing the chimney to collapse. Farm fields on the Eastern Shore of Maryland were saturated with water after the storm, causing farmers to hand-pick their crops. Some tomato, corn, and cantaloupe crops were destroyed.

Delaware

Two 25-year-old men were killed in the Hockessin area in an apparent drowning after attempting to run home through the storm on Saturday night. Their bodies were recovered near Wilmington on Monday afternoon. An EF1 tornado touched down in Lewes, at 6:38 pm, causing a path of destruction 80 yards wide and 3/4 of a mile long, damaging about 50 homes and destroying one. Flooding occurred in many areas including the Delaware Bay communities of Slaughter Beach, Primehook Beach, and Broadkill Beach. Sections of Prime Hook Road leading to Primehook Beach were washed out. Irene flooded and forced the closure of Delaware Route 1 near the Indian River Inlet Bridge, pushing sand onto the road.

Pennsylvania

Five people were killed in Pennsylvania: three died as a result of fallen trees, one was killed in a traffic accident, and a woman was swept away by flooding in the Wissahickon Creek. In Philadelphia, the storm left thousands without power. More than 400 trees fell in Philadelphia, and 200 trees fell in Pittsburgh, seven buildings collapsed and twenty roads were closed. PECO worked on restoring power by mid-week. The Philadelphia Phillies had to postpone an MLB game against the Miami Marlins due to the Hurricane.

New Jersey

While the storm made landfall next to Galloway and Little Egg Harbor in the southeastern part of the state, South Jersey received little damage and flooding. Eleven rivers reached record levels, and a week after the storm all rivers in the state remained at "moderate flooding level". The flooding affected roads, including the heavily used Interstate 287 and Garden State Parkway. Along the Hudson River, floodwaters affected parts of Jersey City and Hoboken. The north tube of the Holland Tunnel was briefly closed. Flooding affected the train lines in the Trenton area. The storm killed seven people in the state, and damage was estimated at around $1 billion.

In addition to major flooding, the combination of already heavily saturated ground from a wet summer, and heavy wind gusts made New Jersey especially vulnerable to wind damage, notably in Union County. Fallen trees blocked vital roads, including portions of New Jersey Route 28 and U.S. Route 22. Numerous homes suffered structural damages from the wind. In total, approximately 1.46 million customers of JCP&L and PSEG throughout most of the 21 counties lost power. On Sunday September 5, power had been returned to last remaining 2,000 residents who suffered a power outage.

Flooding in some parts of the state continued for another three days. On August 31, Paterson counted 6,000 displaced persons, and three of four bridges crossing the Passaic River remained closed. On August 31, President Barack Obama declared the state a disaster area, including all 21 counties. More than 31,000 residents filed assistance claims through FEMA, and within two weeks nearly $38 million had been disbursed with others pending. Hardest-hit counties were Bergen and Passaic in the northeast, each with more than 4,000 claims.

Despite the mandatory evacuations ordered for many parts of the Jersey Shore, the damage and flooding in that area of the state was not as severe as predicted. This miscalculation was met with frustration among many coastal residents that were evacuated out of an abundance of caution. A year later, when evacuations were ordered for Hurricane Sandy, some residents were reluctant or skeptical about the storm's potential and their preparations were more lax, since some of Irene's impacts fell short of the original predictions. This proved very damaging for some, as Hurricane Sandy ended up being far worse than predicted.

New York

In Manhattan, the Hudson River flooded in the Meatpacking District. Long Beach and Freeport, both of which experienced serious flooding, were among the worst-hit towns on Long Island, and many roads were left impassable. The workers at Ground Zero in Lower Manhattan worked to make the World Trade Center site hurricane proof, and escaped major damage, just missing the tenth anniversary of 9/11.

The winds knocked down many trees and power lines, leaving almost 350,000 homes and businesses without power in Nassau and Suffolk counties.

Flooding of the Ramapo River and more than a half-mile (1 km) of washouts led both Metro-North and NJ Transit to suspend service on the Port Jervis Line north of Suffern for nearly three months.

Flooding overwhelmed several sewage treatment plants, since many of them collect and processed storm runoff as well as wastewater. At least 52 municipalities in the Hudson Valley reported raw-sewage spills into local waters. Vaccinations against tetanus and hepatitis were offered to rescuers before entering houses in some areas. Parts of Washingtonville were under  of water during the storm due to the flash flood of Moodna Creek, wrecking some nearby homes.

Disastrous flash floods occurred in the northwestern Catskill Mountains. Record flooding along the Schoharie Creek destroyed the 156-year-old Old Blenheim Bridge, a National Historic Landmark.

Flooding by Schoharie Creek in the village of Prattsville, NY caused major damage and destroyed large areas of the village. Every structure on the strip that comprises Main Street was partly or fully destroyed, including all 22 of the village's businesses. Eleven houses collapsed in the flood, fifteen were condemned and torn down, and more than 100 homes were so damaged that the residents couldn't return to them, but amazingly there were zero fatalities. It received widespread national news coverage because the village had nearly been washed away. Gov. Andrew M. Cuomo labeled Prattsville as the place in New York State hardest hit by the storm.
Local officials estimated that approximately one-third of all the houses and businesses in the village of Schoharie had been destroyed due to flooding. The Gilboa Dam, built in 1926, which had undergone some strengthening procedures during 2005 and 2006, sustained minor damage due to the flooding of the Schoharie Creek.

Further upstate, Irene did significant damage in the Adirondack Mountains. A section of NY 73 was washed out, isolating two hamlets. DEC reported that "landslides too numerous to count" had taken place on many of the High Peaks themselves, all of which are located on state Forest Preserve land. Overall, there were ten deaths in the state, most due to flooding.

In mid-September, farmers reported a smaller-than-average harvest of pumpkins in the northeastern United States. By that point, many farmers in the Black Dirt Region were near bankruptcy, and fundraisers were being held to tide them over pending federal disaster relief. Farmers were worried the reports would deter tourists from visiting farm country for traditional autumn activities and purchases, an economic setback which some said would exacerbate the damage from the storm. Many planned to remain open and offer what they could to visitors.

New England

Connecticut

In Connecticut, 20 homes in East Haven were destroyed and five others were damaged beyond repair by flooding and storm surge along the shore of Long Island Sound. On Sunday, Connecticut's two main electric companies, Connecticut Light and Power and United Illuminating, reported that a record 754,000 customers, about half the state, were without power. More than two days after the storm made landfall, about 400,000 people were still without power, some being told they would have to wait more than a week, especially in heavily wooded areas. In Ridgefield, 90% of houses lost power, requiring the utility to turn off power to the other 10% to ease restoration efforts. Route 15, one of the state's main highways, was closed from the New York state line to Interstate 91 in Meriden due to fallen trees.

Governor Dannel Malloy said Hurricane Irene was responsible for a tenth death on August 28: a man who died in a fire likely caused by downed wires from high winds. An elderly woman, who resided in Prospect, died in similar situations, when a falling tree caused power lines to collapse onto her home, starting a fire; her husband was critically injured. In Bristol, a man drowned when his canoe capsized.

A week later, many homes in Connecticut still had not had their power restored. Connecticut Light & Power said on September 2 that it was ahead of where it expected to be, and that less than 100,000 customers would still be without power by midnight the next day. Crews had come from many distant places in North America, including British Columbia, to help the utility's own crews. The continued outages also meant that in rural areas with private wells, residents still lacked running water a week after the storm.

Massachusetts
In Massachusetts, damage was greatest in the Hill Towns and Western Massachusetts as the eye of the storm tracked westward, toward Albany, New York. High winds toppled trees and heavy rain caused widespread flooding of Connecticut River tributaries. The Westfield River rose almost twenty feet in a matter of hours; the Deerfield River rose over fifteen feet in the same period. Both rivers reached flood stages not seen since the 1955, and 1938, hurricanes and floods. A 6-mile stretch of Route 2 from Charlemont to Florida along the Cold River branch of the Deerfield was closed due to damage for over 3 months.

A public works employee was electrocuted by downed power lines in Southbridge.

A dam failure was mistakenly reported in East Becket, yet 200 people were evacuated as a precaution.

Rhode Island
By the storm's end, an estimated 256,000 out of 480,281 customers were without power. Rhode Island electric company, National Grid, expected it would take until Labor Day weekend to restore power to the most remote areas and areas which were most damaged. On August 30, two days after the storm, 138,000 customers remained without power. A power line on Aquidneck Island near Portsmouth was felled by winds during the morning of August 28, severing power to Portsmouth, Middletown, Newport and Jamestown. Power was not fully restored to Aquidneck Island and Conanicut Island communities until August 30. The storm surge into Narragansett Bay caused some coastal damage, although Providence, at the head of the bay, was spared downtown flooding in part due to its hurricane barrier. There was some localized river flooding, however being on the eastern side of the storm, most of the damage came in the form of wind.

Vermont
Almost every river and stream in Vermont flooded, resulting in at least three deaths and one missing. In Wilmington, the flood level of the Deerfield River east branch reportedly exceeded levels measured during the 1938 New England hurricane – the only other tropical cyclone to make a direct hit on Vermont in the state's recorded history. Throughout Vermont, numerous covered bridges, many over 100 years old, were damaged or destroyed. Extensive road damage resulted in the isolation of over a dozen rural towns that would require helicopter air-lifts of necessities in the days immediately following the storm. The storm decimated multiple sections of U.S. Route 4 between Rutland and Quechee, making east/west travel through the central part of state nearly impossible. The resort town of Killington as well as neighboring Pittsfield were completely isolated from travel in and out for two weeks. Statewide, the cost of repairs for road and bridge damage alone was estimated to exceed $700 million.

Relief concerts were organized by local Vermont bands such as Phish and Grace Potter and the Nocturnals. By December the state was recovering more quickly than originally expected. Within a month of the storm 84 of 118 closed sections of state highway, and 28 of 34 bridges, had been reopened. The state had relied on assistance from National Guard units in eight other states, and highway workers lent to it by New Hampshire and Maine. "We'll do the work and we'll figure out how we're paying for it," said deputy state secretary of transportation Sue Minter, "but we're not waiting." Repair costs ultimately turned out to be $175–200 million, with most of it covered by federal disaster relief.

Maine

Tropical storm conditions occurred throughout the state of Maine during Irene's passage. Flooding caused by Irene's heavy rainfall washed out two bridges on State Route 27 in Carrabassett Valley.

Canada
Irene also affected a large section of Canada, stretching from the eastern Ontario to the coasts of Newfoundland and Labrador. One person was killed after a road was washed out and cars were swept into the Yamaska River near Sorel-Tracy; another section of road in Charlevoix was also washed out, while flooding forced evacuations in Estrie. In New Brunswick, many trees fell in the wake of the hurricane, mainly due to the strong winds associated with the storm. Power was lost to an estimated 75,000 – 200,000 New Brunswick residents, directly due to the gale-force winds. Insured damage in Canada was estimated at $130 million.

Described as "A photographic scavenger hunt set to a hurricane", Wikipedia Takes Montreal was held August 28, coinciding with the hurricane.

Retirement

Owing to the high death toll and extensive damage wrought by the storm, the name Irene was later retired by the World Meteorological Organization, and will never again be used for an Atlantic tropical cyclone. It was replaced for the 2017 season with Irma.

Response efforts 
Direct Relief, a disaster relief organization, among many other organizations, collaborated to offer assistance for people affected by Irene.

See also

 1806 Great Coastal hurricane 
 1821 Norfolk and Long Island hurricane 
 1938 New England hurricane 
 Hurricane Carol (1954) 
 Hurricane Connie (1955) 
 Hurricane Diane (1955) 
 Hurricane Gloria (1985) 
 Hurricane Bob (1991) 
 Hurricane Floyd (1999) 
 Hurricane Isabel (2003) 
 Hurricane Sandy (2012) 
 Hurricane Isaias (2020) 
 List of New England hurricanes
 List of New York hurricanes
 List of New Jersey hurricanes
 List of Pennsylvania hurricanes
 List of Delaware hurricanes
 List of Maryland hurricanes
 List of Canada hurricanes
 List of costliest Atlantic hurricanes
 List of retired Atlantic hurricane names
 List of Category 3 Atlantic hurricanes

References

External links

National Hurricane Center's advisory archive
Hydrometeorological Prediction Center's advisory archive
NASA's storm data on Hurricane Irene
Environment Canada's Advisory archive

 
Irene
2011 disasters in Canada
2011 in Puerto Rico
2011 in the Bahamas
2011 in the British Virgin Islands
2011 in the Dominican Republic
2011 in the Turks and Caicos Islands
2011 in the United States Virgin Islands
Irene
Irene
Irene
Irene
Irene
Irene
Irene
Irene
Irene
Irene
Irene
Irene
Irene
Irene
Irene
Irene
Irene
Irene
Irene
Irene
Irene
Irene
Irene
Irene
Irene
Irene
Irene
Irene
2011 in the Caribbean
2011 natural disasters in the United States
Articles containing video clips
Irene